Spratling is a surname. Notable people with the surname include:

Col Spratling (1918–2006), Australian rules footballer
Huw Spratling (born 1949), British composer
William Spratling (1900–1967), American silversmith and artist
William P. Spratling (1863–1915), American neurologist
Chris Spratling Kent UK athlete Basketball Power forward/center